Raúl Damián Torres Rodríguez (born 26 August 1996) is a Mexican professional footballer who plays as a midfielder for Liga de Expansión MX club Atlético Morelia.

Career statistics

Club

Honours
Tigres UANL
Liga MX: Clausura 2019
Campeón de Campeones: 2018

References

1996 births
Living people
Association football midfielders
Tigres UANL footballers
Venados F.C. players
Liga MX players
Ascenso MX players
Liga Premier de México players
Tercera División de México players
Sportspeople from Monclova
Footballers from Coahuila
Mexican footballers